Crambus claviger is a moth in the family Crambidae. It was described by Otto Staudinger in 1899. It is found in Chile.

References

Crambini
Moths described in 1899
Moths of South America
Endemic fauna of Chile